Hayat TV is the name of the following two television networks:

 Hayat TV (Bosnia and Herzegovina)
 Hayat TV (Turkey)